The Bulakul family is one of Thailand's first and oldest business families and is of Cantonese Chinese descent, descended from the Ma clan. It traces its origins to Ma Tong-zen (1871–1923), an engineer who immigrated to Siam in 1888, and his son  (1897–1964), who adopted the Thai name Mah Bulakul in 1941, the surname being granted by Prime Minister Plaek Phibunsongkhram, under royal decree. Mah built his fortune from rice milling starting in the early 20th century and was part of the "Big Five" families across Asia to control rice trade, while also holding prominent political positions. The family's business holdings has since expanded under his descendants to form a conglomerate covering real estate, financial services, retail, shipping, food and beverage, and media and entertainment. 

Among the family's holdings and past ventures include: 

 Mah Boon Krong Drying and Silo Company (now MBK Group), which has expanded into retail, hospitality and recreation such as golf, under Mah's son Sirichai Bulakul. In the 1980s he also developed Mahboonkrong Center, Thailand's first ever large-scale shopping mall; 
 Toshiba Southeast Asia, the regional headquarter for Southeast Asia and Oceania operations, founded by Niramol Bulakul;  
 Farm Chokchai, Thailand's largest dairy farm and one of the largest in Asia situated on over 8,000 acres of land developed by Chokchai Bulakul. It is also a tourist attraction; 
 The Brooker Group, a listed financial advisory and asset manager specialising in alternative assets led by Chan Bulakul. The Company primarily serves High Net Worth Individuals (HNWIs) in Southeast Asia;
 Several other real estate projects across Thailand and Southeast Asia, including the previous tallest building in Thailand;

The majority of the family's businesses continue to be privately held.

In 2020, The Brooker Group became the first publicly listed company in the world approved by regulating authorities to invest in decentralized finance (DeFi) tokens and decentralized applications (dApps).

Notable members 
 Ratchaneewan Bulakul

References 

 
Thai Chinese families
Business families of Thailand